George Sherman Keller (born May 16, 1881) was a clergyman and an American football player and coach. He played varsity football at the University of Pennsylvania  for one season before earning his undergraduate degree and enrolling at the Philadelphia Divinity School He graduated with his seminary degree in 1907 and served as a pastor at several locations in Minnesota and South Dakota. Keller spent two seasons (1908–1909) as the head football coach at the South Dakota School of Mines in Rapid City, South Dakota, where he compiled a record of 10–1.

References

1881 births
Year of death missing
American clergy
Penn Quakers football players
South Dakota Mines Hardrockers football coaches
Players of American football from New York City